Sodium-dependent phosphate transporter 2 is a protein that in humans is encoded by the SLC20A2 gene.

Genomics

This gene is found on the short arm of chromosome 8 (8p12-p11) on the minus (Crick) strand. It is 123,077 bases in length. The encoded protein has 652 amino acids and the predicted molecular weight of the protein is 70.392 kiloDaltons.

Function 

The protein acts as a homodimer and is involved in phosphate transport by absorbing phosphate from interstitial fluid for normal cellular functions such as cellular metabolism, signal transduction, and nucleic acid and lipid synthesis.

Clinical significance 

Mutations in the  SLC20A2 gene are associated with idiopathic basal ganglia calcification (Fahr's syndrome). This association suggests that familial idiopathic basal ganglia calcification is caused by changes in phosphate homeostasis, since this gene encodes for PIT-2, an inorganic phosphate transporter.

See also
 Solute carrier family

References

Further reading

Solute carrier family